Leighton Owen Clarkson (born 19 October 2001) is an English professional footballer who plays as a midfielder for Aberdeen on loan from Liverpool.

Career
Clarkson made his professional debut for Liverpool on 17 December 2019, coming on as a substitute in the away match against Aston Villa in the quarter-finals of the EFL Cup.

On 4 February 2020, he played in the FA Cup 4th Round replay against Shrewsbury Town, winning 1–0 in the youngest-ever Liverpool side in history.	
	
On 24 July 2020, Clarkson signed a long-term contract with Liverpool.

On 9 December 2020, he was named in the starting eleven for a Champions League group stage game against Danish side FC Midtjylland.

On 16 August 2021, it was announced that Clarkson would join hometown club Blackburn Rovers on a season-long loan deal. His loan was cut short in January 2022.
Scored on his Aberdeen debut in a 4-1 win over St Mirren.

In December 2022 he was unanimously voted by Aberdeen fans as the 2nd best loanee that Scottish Football has ever seen, behind only  James Maddison.

International career
On 6 September 2021, Clarkson made his debut for the England U20s during a 6-1 victory over Romania U20s at St. George's Park.

Career statistics

Club

Honours
Liverpool Academy
 FA Youth Cup: 2018–19
 Lancashire Senior Cup: 2021-22

References

External links
 
 
 
 

2001 births
Living people
Footballers from Blackburn
English footballers
Association football midfielders
Liverpool F.C. players
Blackburn Rovers F.C. players 
England youth international footballers
Aberdeen F.C. players
Scottish Professional Football League players